William Leman may refer to:

Sir William Leman, 1st Baronet
Sir William Leman, 2nd Baronet
Sir William Leman, 3rd Baronet of the Leman baronets